Alka Badola Kaushal is an Indian actress and producer, known for her work in Bollywood. She is also popular for her roles in TV shows such as Kumkum – Ek Pyara Sa Bandhan and Qubool Hai. She has played supportive roles in numerous Hindi TV serials, mainly negative characters or vamps. She played the role of Sushma Oberoi in Mose Chhal Kiye Jaaye.

Personal life
Kaushal is the eldest of three children born to stage artist Vishwa Mohan S. Badola and Susheela Badola. She had attended the National School of Drama Repertory in her hometown Delhi, and later moved to Mumbai to pursue a career on Indian television. She is married to TV producer and director, Ravi G. Kaushal; the couple have started their own production house, Mangalam Arts.

In 2017, the actress and her mother were sent for two years to Sangrur district jail after the Sangrur (Punjab) court upheld the two-year jail term given to the television actress and her mother in a cheque-bounce case by a lower court. Alka and her mother had borrowed Rs.50 lakh from farmer Avtar Singh, to make a serial and gave him two cheques of Rs 25 lakh each which bounced and so he moved a local court in Malerkotla in 2015, which sentenced the two to two years' imprisonment.

Acting career
She made her television debut with Ramesh Sippy's Gathaand and later acted in Tum Pukar Lo, Manzilein Apni Apni and Prratima. Kaushal has worked in serials like Faasle, 9 Malabar Hill, Sansar, Kartavya and Kammal. She is also seen in Zee TV's serial Qubool Hai. She was out of Qubool Hai for six months. She has acted in Swaragini - Jodein Rishton Ke Sur as Parvati Gadodia and Tarkeshwari Singh/Tharka Bua on Sarojini. In July and November 2020, She played Sita Choudhary in Yeh Rishta Kya Kehlata Hai and Tara Bai in Colors TV's Barrister Babu respectively.

Since December 2020, she is playing Devi Sabherwal in Shaurya Aur Anokhi Ki Kahani.

Filmography
As actress:

Television

Films

As producer
 Meet Mila De Rabba
 Kho Gayi Manzilein… Kho Gayi
 Naya Daur
 Saturday Suspense
 Thriller @ 10

References

External links
 

Year of birth missing (living people)
Living people
Actresses from Mumbai
Indian film actresses
Indian stage actresses
Actresses from New Delhi
Actresses in Hindi cinema
Actresses in Marathi cinema
Indian television producers
Indian soap opera actresses
Indian television actresses
Actresses in Hindi television
20th-century Indian actresses
21st-century Indian actresses
Indian women television producers
Women television producers
Actors from Mumbai